Open Source Tripwire is a free software security and data integrity tool for monitoring and alerting on specific file change(s) on a range of systems. The project is based on code originally contributed by Tripwire, Inc. in 2000.

See also

 AIDE
 Host-based intrusion detection system comparison
 OSSEC
 Samhain

References

External links
 Tripwire, Inc.

Free security software
Intrusion detection systems
Linux security software